William Bradford Myers (born  December 10, 1990) is an American professional baseball outfielder and first baseman for the Cincinnati Reds of Major League Baseball (MLB). He has previously played in MLB for the Tampa Bay Rays and San Diego Padres.

Originally drafted by the Kansas City Royals, he was traded to the Rays in 2012. He won the AL Rookie of the Year Award in 2013.

Early career
Myers attended and played baseball at Wesleyan Christian Academy in High Point, North Carolina. 
As a freshman, Myers had a .450 batting average and was an all-state third baseman. During his junior year, he went 10–0 as a pitcher. After committing to the University of South Carolina, Myers was drafted by the Kansas City Royals. In 2008, his team won a state championship.

Professional career

Kansas City Royals
Myers was drafted by the Kansas City Royals as a catcher in the third round, with the 91st overall selection, of the 2009 Major League Baseball draft. Myers signed a contract with the Royals, that included a $2 million signing bonus, in August 2009. Before the draft, Myers had committed to South Carolina during his junior year.

Myers made his debut in professional baseball in 2009, when he played catcher and batted .369 with five home runs in 84 at bats with Royals' Rookie League affiliates, the Idaho Falls Chukars and the Burlington Royals. Myers began the 2010 season playing catcher for the Burlington Bees of the Midwest League and was named to the Midwest League All Star team. On July 1, 2010, the Royals promoted Myers to the Wilmington Blue Rocks of the Carolina League, a league generally considered more advanced than those in which he had previously played.  Myers played catcher and finished the 2010 season batting .315 with a .429 on-base percentage overall, and totaled 14 home runs, 83 runs batted in, and 85 walks between his time in the Midwest League and Carolina League. In 2011, playing for the Class AA Northwest Arkansas Naturals, he batted .254 with eight home runs and 49 RBIs in 99 games. He played primarily outfield in 2012, and was named to appear in the 2012 All-Star Futures Game.

Tampa Bay Rays (2013–2014)
On December 9, 2012, Myers was traded to the Tampa Bay Rays (along with Jake Odorizzi, Patrick Leonard, and Mike Montgomery) in exchange for James Shields, Wade Davis, and a player to be named later (later chosen to be Elliot Johnson). He started the 2013 season with the Triple-A Durham Bulls of the International League. On June 17, Myers was called up to the Rays, for whom he played outfield.

Myers won the AL Rookie of the Year award in 2013, beating teammate and pitcher Chris Archer and Detroit shortstop José Iglesias. In spite of the fact that he did not join the Rays until their 70th game on June 18, Myers led AL rookies with a 53 RBIs in the 88 games he played. The last player to lead AL rookies in RBIs in fewer than 90 games was Hoot Evers playing for the Detroit Tigers in 1946, when he had 33 in 81 games. He also became the first-ever hitter to win the award in under 100 games.

In the post-season, he had two singles in 20 at bats.

Myers entered 2014 as the Rays' everyday right fielder. On May 4, Myers hit his first career inside-the-park home run. During a game against the Boston Red Sox on May 30, Myers collided with Desmond Jennings while attempting to catch a fly ball, resulting in a stress fracture in Myers' right wrist, which required a cast and significant rehab time. Myers returned to the club on August 20, initially slotted as a DH before returning to the field.

In 2014, he batted .222/.294/.320 with six home runs and 35 RBIs in 325 at bats.

San Diego Padres (2015–2022)
On December 19, 2014, the Rays traded Myers, Ryan Hanigan, and Jose Castillo to the San Diego Padres as part of a three-team transaction, in which the Padres traded Jake Bauers, Burch Smith, and René Rivera to the Rays, the Padres traded Joe Ross and Trea Turner to the Washington Nationals, and Washington traded Steven Souza and Travis Ott to Tampa Bay.

2015
Myers was the Padres 2015 Opening Day center fielder and manned the position through April and into May.  Myers went on the disabled list in early May with tendinitis in his left wrist, and missed a month.  After returning for only three games in June, he went back on the disabled list as the wrist continued to bother him.  Myers returned from the DL on September 4 after a surgical procedure to shave down a bone spur irritating the tendon.  Following his return, Myers began playing first base in addition to the outfield, with Melvin Upton Jr. and Travis Jankowski getting most of the starts in center after the trade of Will Venable.

In 2015, he batted .253/.336/.427 with eight home runs and 29 RBIs in 225 at bats.

2017
On January 17, 2017, Myers signed a six-year $83 million extension with the Padres.

Myers hit for the cycle on April 10, 2017 at Coors Field against the Colorado Rockies. It was the second cycle in Padres history. On September 2, a commemorative bobblehead celebrating his accomplishment was handed out to fans at Petco Park.

For the season, Myers continued to hit for power, hitting 30 home runs, and speed, stealing 20 bases. He tied for the National League lead in power-speed number (24.0). However, his consistency declined, as the season saw him striking out 180 times, the second-highest total in the National League, with his batting average declining to .243, and him hitting just .222 with runners in scoring position. On defense, he played almost exclusively first base.

2018
In early April, Myers suffered from nerve irritation in his right arm and was placed on the disabled list, and on April 28 he suffered a left oblique strain and was again placed on the disabled list. On July 7, Myers hit three homers in a 20–5 loss to the Arizona Diamondbacks. The 15-run loss was the first time in Major League history that a team had a player hit three home runs and go on to lose by double digits. On August 4, he was placed on the disabled list with a bruised left foot.

Myers was involved in a controversy in early September, when footage emerged during a live stream of teammate Carlos Asuaje playing the video game Fortnite involved Myers, chatting with Asuaje while playing, criticizing manager Andy Green. Myers apologized to Green and took responsibility for the remarks. 

He ended the season batting .253 with 11 home runs and 39 RBIs in 83 games. He played 41 games in the outfield, 36 at third base, and two at first base. In his major league career through 2018, Myers played 329 games at first base, 248 games in the outfield, and 37 games at third base.

2019 

Over the offseason before the 2019 season, the Padres signed star third baseman Manny Machado, which moved Wil Myers to the outfield. Due to the emergence of corner outfielders Franmil Reyes and Hunter Renfroe in 2018 while Myers was injured, he was also involved in trade rumors, but nothing materialized. On opening day, Myers hit the first home run of the Padres season. On April 15, Myers hit his 100th career home run in a home loss to the Rockies. However, 2019 was considered a lost season for Myers, as he struck out in well over 30% of his plate appearances, struggled in "clutch" situations, and fell out of favor with Green and management.

Following the DFA of Robbie Erlin on October 31, Myers became the longest-tenured Padre.

2020 
In the 2020 season shortened by COVID-19, Myers played in 55 of the 60 games and batted .288/.353/.606 with 15 home runs and 40 RBIs.

On August 18, Myers hit a grand slam in a 6–4 road win against the Texas Rangers, which extended San Diego’s grand slam streak to 2 games. Two days later, the Padres would make history as the first team in MLB history to hit a grand slam in four consecutive games. 

This year also marked the first winning season and first Postseason appearance for Myers in San Diego, with the Padres making the Postseason for the first time since 2006. In 6 Postseason games, Myers slashed .227/.346/.545 with 2 home runs and 5 RBIs.

2021 
Following the addition of Blake Snell, Myers switched to number 5 for the first time in his career.

In 146 games, Myers regressed to a .256/.334/.434 batting line, adding 17 home runs and 68 RBIs.

Cincinnati Reds
Myers signed a one-year contract worth $7.5 million, $1.5 million in achievable incentives, and a mutual option for the 2024 season with the Cincinnati Reds on December 22, 2022.

Personal life
Myers' parents are Eric and Pamela Myers. He has a younger brother named Beau who pitched to him in the 2016 Home Run Derby. He married Maggie Reaves on November 3, 2018. During his tenure with the Padres, broadcaster Mark Grant nicknamed him "El Gallo" ("The Rooster" in Spanish), due to his hairstyle.

In November 2021, Myers and Carmel Country Club in Charlotte sued each other. Carmel claims Myers owes the club $64,000 in initiation fees, and Myers is calling for more than $150,000 in damages, claiming that the club hides how difficult it is to get tee times.

See also
 List of Major League Baseball players to hit for the cycle

References

External links

1990 births
Living people
Baseball players from North Carolina
Burlington Bees players
Burlington Royals players
Durham Bulls players
Idaho Falls Chukars players
Major League Baseball first basemen
Major League Baseball outfielders
Major League Baseball Rookie of the Year Award winners
National League All-Stars
Northwest Arkansas Naturals players
Omaha Storm Chasers players
People from Thomasville, North Carolina
San Diego Padres players
Surprise Saguaros players
Tampa Bay Rays players
Wilmington Blue Rocks players